Kristo Laanti, professionally known as DJ Kridlokk, Khid, Krid or DJ Kridmanne, is a Finnish rapper and record producer. His career took off in 2005 when he released an album Maanalaisella saundilla with a fellow rapper Lommo. On 18 May 2011 he released a solo album UG-Solo which peaked at number 23 on the Official Finnish Album Chart. His 2014 album Mutsi reached number two.

In addition to his solo work, DJ Kridlokk is also a member of the group Kylmä, and has appeared as a featured artist on several songs by such rappers as Eevil Stöö, Koksukoo and Tuuttimörkö.

Selected discography

Albums

Joint albums and EPs

Remix albums

Compilations
Redrum-187 (2008)
Ghetto Tyylit (2011)

As a featured guest
"Ontuen" by Murmurecordings (2002)
"Liikaa" by J Riskit (2007)
"Rajoitetut elämät" by Saurus (2011)
"Lainaan enkä palauta Pt. 2" by Eevil Stöö (2011)
"Euro Crack Rocks" by Julma-Henri & RPK (2012)
"Ole niinku olet, ole niin kuolet" by Julma-Henri & RPK (2012)
"Streiffaa" by Eevil Stöö & Koksukoo (2012)
"Totuus" by Tuuttimörkö (2013)

As a producer
"Liito-oravan villejä – UG Solo Vol. 3" by Lommo (2003)
"Stöö of Destruction" by Eevil Stöö (2011)
"On totta" by Tuuttimörkö (2012)
Malarian pelko by Paperi-T (2015)

References

Living people
Finnish rappers
Finnish hip hop record producers
Year of birth missing (living people)